Harold Wilson Finney (July 30, 1905 - December 22, 1991) was a Major League Baseball catcher. During the 1922 season, he appeared in six games, exclusively as a pinch runner.

Finney held the record for non-pitchers for most at bats in a season without a hit. In 1936, Finney went 0-for-35, with an on-base percentage of .000 as well. This was the overall record for most at bats with a .000 OBP until , when it was broken by pitcher Jason Bergmann. He did score 3 runs and have 3 RBI in his last major league season.  Dodgers's infielder Eugenio Vélez finished the 2011 season hitless in 37 at-bats to break Finney's record.

Finney was the brother of fellow major leaguer Lou Finney.

References

1905 births
1991 deaths
Albany Senators players
Baseball players from Alabama
Columbia Comers players
Gadsden Eagles players
Hazleton Mountaineers players
Major League Baseball catchers
People from LaFayette, Alabama
Pittsburgh Pirates players
Talladega Indians players